Justice Democrats is an American progressive political action committee and caucus founded on January 23, 2017, by two leaders of Bernie Sanders's 2016 presidential campaign, Saikat Chakrabarti and Zack Exley, as well as political commentators Kyle Kulinski and Cenk Uygur of The Young Turks. The organization formed as a result of the 2016 United States presidential election and aspires "to elect a new type of Democratic majority in Congress" that will "create a thriving economy and democracy that works for the people, not big money interests". The group advocates for campaign finance reform (reducing the role of money in politics) and endorses only candidates who pledge to refuse donations from corporate PACs and lobbyists.

Kulinski and Uygur are no longer part of the group and have since become critics of the group. Alexandra Rojas became the organization's executive director in May 2018.

During the 2018 elections, Justice Democrats ran 79 progressive candidates against Democrats, Republicans and Independents in local, state, and federal elections. The seven Justice Democrats candidates who won their electoral congressional races in 2018 were Raúl Grijalva, Pramila Jayapal, Ro Khanna, Alexandria Ocasio-Cortez, Ilhan Omar, Ayanna Pressley, and Rashida Tlaib.

The group endorsed considerably fewer candidates in 2020 than in 2018, a move its communications director defended as a strategy to focus its resources on the most promising candidates. Jamaal Bowman, Cori Bush, and Marie Newman were elected to the U.S. House of Representatives in 2020.

In 2022, Greg Casar and Summer Lee were elected to the House, while Newman lost her reelection in the Democratic primaries.

History
After the 2016 presidential election resulted in a victory for Donald Trump, many progressives pointed to the perceived loyalty of politicians to large donors as a major contributing factor to Hillary Clinton's loss to Trump. These critics contend that a campaign finance model similar to that of Bernie Sanders, whose 2016 presidential campaign was funded by small individual donations, will increase public trust in politicians through increased accountability to their constituents.

On January 23, 2017, Cenk Uygur and Kyle Kulinski founded Justice Democrats with ten others, including former staffers from the Sanders campaign such as its Director of Organizing Technology, Saikat Chakrabarti, and MoveOn.org fundraiser Zack Exley. According to the organization, it seeks to create a left-wing populist movement to support alternative Democratic candidates beginning with the 2018 midterm elections, in order to either defeat the incumbent Democrats or make them more accountable to their constituents. It requires its candidates to take a pledge to refuse financial contributions from billionaires and corporations. In addition, it hoped to rebuild the Democratic Party on a national level and defeat Trump in the 2020 presidential election.

On March 20, 2017, Justice Democrats reported that they had received 8,300 nominations and raised $1 million. Also in March 2017, it teamed up with Brand New Congress, a PAC established by former Sanders campaign supporters, to further their goals. By November 1, 2017, they had merged with fellow progressive group AllOfUs.

On May 9, 2017, Representative Ro Khanna of California's 17th congressional district announced that he had become a Justice Democrat, the first sitting member of Congress to join the organization. Over the following year, Raúl Grijalva of Arizona's 3rd congressional district and Pramila Jayapal of Washington's 7th congressional district also joined, bringing the number of sitting representatives in Justice Democrats to three. Khanna and Jayapal were first elected to the House in 2016 while Grijalva has been an incumbent since 2002.

During the 2018 elections, Justice Democrats ran 79 progressive candidates against Democrats, Republicans and Independents in local, state, and federal elections. 26 of them advanced past the primary stage. All Justice Democrat candidates running for office were endorsed by The Young Turks, who provided them with a media platform on their interview show Rebel HQ. The seven Justice Democrats candidates who won their electoral congressional races in 2018 were Ayanna Pressley, Rashida Tlaib, Ilhan Omar, Alexandria Ocasio-Cortez, and the three sitting members. All seven won districts already held by Democrats.

In 2020, Justice Democrat Marie Newman defeated incumbent Representative Dan Lipinski in the 2020 primary for Illinois's 3rd congressional district. Jamaal Bowman defeated incumbent Representative Eliot Engel in New York's 16th congressional district's primary. Bowman was also endorsed by Justice Democrats. Another Justice Democrat-endorsed candidate won in Missouri's 1st congressional district, when Cori Bush defeated Representative Lacy Clay.

Summer for Progress 
In July 2017, several progressive organizations, including Our Revolution, Democratic Socialists of America, National Nurses United, Working Families Party, and Brand New Congress, announced a push to encourage House Democrats to sign on to a #PeoplesPlatform, which meant supporting "eight bills currently in the House of Representatives that will address the concerns of everyday Americans". These eight bills and the topics they address are:

Medicare for All: H.R. 676, the Medicare For All Act
Free College Tuition: H.R. 1880, the College for All Act of 2017
Worker Rights: H.R. 15, the Raise the Wage Act
Women's Rights: H.R. 771, the Equal Access to Abortion Coverage in Health Insurance (EACH Woman) Act of 2017
Voting Rights: H.R. 2840, the Automatic Voter Registration Act
Environmental Justice: H.R. 4114, the Environmental Justice Act of 2017
Criminal Justice and Immigrant Rights: H.R. 3227, the Justice Is Not for Sale Act of 2017
Taxing Wall Street: H.R. 1144, the Inclusive Prosperity Act

Uygur's resignation
On December 22, 2017, it was announced that Uygur had resigned from the organization, after the revelation of previously deleted but archived controversial blog posts he had written. The next day, Kulinski announced that he had stepped down from the organization as he disagreed with staff members who pressed for Uygur's dismissal. He said his decision came as a result of a personal dilemma as he saw the posts in question upon rereading them as satirical. Kulinski noted that the decision to ask for Uygur's resignation came from Justice Democrat staff, not the candidates, and asked his supporters to continue backing the organization's candidates.

In mid-November 2019, Uygur filed to run for Congress in California's 25th district, a seat recently vacated by the resignation of Katie Hill. Uygur stated he would not run as a member of the Justice Democrats.

Ideology and political issues
According to Justice Democrats, its highest priority is to effectively eliminate the role of money and conflicts of interests in politics. As such, any candidate running with Justice Democrats must pledge to refuse donations from corporate PACs and lobbyists. Declining money from corporate PACs and supporting Medicare for All have both been described as litmus tests for the organization. Justice Democrats supports publicly funded elections, banning Super PACs, and banning private donations to politicians and campaigns. It also advocates for the reinstatement of provisions of the Voting Rights Act of 1965 and a ban on gerrymandering for partisan gain. Several members have voiced support for a constitutional amendment to remove money from American politics.

To accompany its launch, Kulinski and Uygur published the following set of progressive founding principles for the coalition. Adjustments have been made since 2017, resulting in a slightly different platform appearing on the Justice Democrats webpage at a given time.
Creating a new infrastructure program called the "Green New Deal"
Ending arms sales to countries that it says violate human rights such as Saudi Arabia, Israel and Egypt
Enacting a federal job guarantee, which would promise all Americans a job paying $15 per hour plus benefits
Ending the death penalty
Ending the practice of unilaterally waging war, except as a last resort to defend U.S. territory
Ending the War on Drugs in favor of legalization, regulation, and taxation of drugs, and pardoning all non-violent drug offenders and treating all drug addicts
Ensuring free speech on college campuses and supporting net neutrality
Ensuring universal education as a right, including free four-year public college and university education
Ensuring universal healthcare as a right
Establishing paid maternity leave, paid vacation leave, and free childcare
Expanding anti-discrimination laws to apply to LGBT people 
Expanding background checks on firearms and banning high capacity magazines and assault weapons
Funding Planned Parenthood and other contraceptive and abortion services, and recognizing reproductive rights
Implementing electoral reform and publicly financed elections nationwide to make irrelevant and obsolete fundraising from large corporations and the wealthy
Implementing instant-runoff voting nationwide in an effort to make third-party and independent candidates more viable
Implementing the Buffett Rule, ending offshore financial centers, "chain[ing]" the capital gains and income taxes, and increasing the estate tax
Making the minimum wage a living wage and tying it to inflation
Pardoning Edward Snowden, prosecuting CIA torturers and DoD war criminals, shutting down the Guantanamo Bay detention camp and all other extrajudicial prisons, and ending warrantless spying and bulk data collection by the National Security Agency
Passing the Paycheck Fairness Act
Abolishing the U.S. Immigration and Customs Enforcement agency (ICE)
Reforming police by mandating body cameras, establishing community oversight boards, eliminating broken windows policing, ending stop and frisk, and appointing special prosecutors to hold police accountable in courts
Renegotiating CAFTA-DR and NAFTA, and opposing Permanent Normal Trade Relations with China and the World Trade Organization
Stopping any reductions to Social Security, Medicare, and Medicaid, and establishing single-payer universal healthcare
Stopping anthropogenic climate change through an ecological revolution and upholding the United States' participation in the Paris Climate Agreement
Uncompromisingly rejecting President Trump's immigration proposals and policies, particularly Executive Order 13769 and deportation of illegal immigrants, and implementing comprehensive immigration reform which will include giving non-criminal illegal immigrants a path to citizenship

Members 
All Congressional Justice Democrats members are House of Representatives members from the Democratic Party. As of the 118th Congress, there are 11 declared Justice Democrats, all of whom are House members.

United States House of Representatives

Current (11)

Former (1)

Announcements 
On May 9, 2017, Ro Khanna of California's 17th congressional district announced that he was a member of Justice Democrats and supported the organization's agenda.
On December 6, 2017, Justice Democrats announced that Raúl Grijalva of Arizona's 3rd congressional district had joined the group.
On April 16, 2018, Justice Democrats announced that Pramila Jayapal of Washington's 7th congressional district had joined the group.
On January 3, 2019, Alexandria Ocasio-Cortez of New York's 14th congressional district, Ilhan Omar of Minnesota's 5th congressional district, Ayanna Pressley of Massachusetts's 7th congressional district and Rashida Tlaib of Michigan's 13th congressional district were sworn in as members of the House of Representatives and as Justice Democrats. They have been dubbed "The Squad".
On January 3, 2021, Jamaal Bowman of New York's 16th congressional district, Cori Bush of Missouri's 1st congressional district, and Marie Newman of Illinois's 3rd congressional district were sworn in.

Political activity

2018
Justice Democrats officially endorsed 79 candidates in the 2018 election cycle, seven of whom won general elections (three were incumbents). The four first-time officeholders in the U.S. House make up "The Squad".

Governor

Lieutenant Governor

U.S. Senate

U.S. House

2020
Justice Democrats endorsed 17 candidates in the Democratic primaries for president, Senate and House. Twelve House candidates made it to the general election (7 incumbents, 5 newcomers). All the incumbents and three newcomers won.

U.S. President

U.S. Senate

U.S. House

2021

U.S. House

2022
Justice Democrats endorsed 10 incumbents and 6 newcomers. All but one incumbent won, as did two newcomers.

U.S. House

Notes

See also 
Brand New Congress
Wolf PAC
Sunrise Movement

References

External links 

JD YouTube channel
Justice Democrats Ballotpedia page
 Justice Democrats financial reports from the Federal Election Commission

2017 establishments in California
2017 in American politics
Aftermath of the 2016 United States presidential election
Anti-corporate activism
Bernie Sanders 2016 presidential campaign
Democratic Party (United States) organizations
Left-wing populism in the United States
Organizations based in Los Angeles
Progressive organizations in the United States
The Young Turks (talk show)
United States political action committees
Caucuses of the United States Congress
Factions in the Democratic Party (United States)